Aleksandr Tambovtsev (born 18 January 1964) is a Soviet wrestler. He competed in the men's freestyle 82 kg at the 1988 Summer Olympics.

References

External links
 

1964 births
Living people
Soviet male sport wrestlers
Olympic wrestlers of the Soviet Union
Wrestlers at the 1988 Summer Olympics
Place of birth missing (living people)